The 2018 Petit Le Mans (formally known as the 2018 MOTUL Petit Le Mans for sponsorship reasons) was the 21st running of the Petit Le Mans, and was held on October 15th 2018. It was the last race in the 2018 IMSA WeatherTech Sportscar Championship, and the last race of the 2018 Tequila Patron North American Endurance Cup, and was run at Road Atlanta in Braselton, Georgia. The race was won overall by the #10 Wayne Taylor Racing Cadillac DPi-V.R.

Background

Entry List 
Due to a highly controversial change made by the FIA/ACO in the 2018-19 FIA World Endurance Championship, which saw the date of the 6 Hours of Fuji moved to allow Fernando Alonso to compete at the home race of the sole LMP1 manufacturer, Toyota, several drivers which were due to compete in both events were unable to do so.  As such, the entry list featured a large number of changes compared to the previous rounds of the championship.

Qualifying 
Pole Positions for each class is denoted in Bold.

Race

Results 
Class winners are denoted in bold.

References 
Petit Le Mans
2018 WeatherTech SportsCar Championship season

